The 1918–19 Maltese First Division was the eighth season of the Maltese First Division and was won by team representing the King's Own Malta Regiment.

League table

Results

See also 
 1918 in association football
 1919 in association football

1918-19
1918–19 in European association football leagues
1918 in Malta
1919 in Malta